Aurélien N'Zuzi Zola (born November 16, 1999 in Évry, Essonne), better known by the mononym Zola, is a French rapper of Congolese descent. Cicatrices, his debut album was released in 2019. His song "California Girls" was featured in the soundtrack of the film Taxi 5. He released his second album Survie in 2020 for which he sold 24,000 records in 7 days.

Discography

Albums

Singles

As lead artist

Other charted songs

References

1999 births
Living people
French rappers
French people of Democratic Republic of the Congo descent
People from Évry, Essonne
Rappers from Essonne